The 2010 Wyoming gubernatorial election was held on Tuesday, November 2, 2010 to elect the Governor of Wyoming. Party primaries were held on August 17.

While it was initially thought that term limits would prevent incumbent Democratic Governor Dave Freudenthal from running for re-election, the constitutionality of the term limit law has been questioned, leaving the possibility that if Freudenthal had successfully challenged the law, he might have been able to run for a third term. On March 4, 2010, Freudenthal announced he would not run for a third term.

Republican candidate Matt Mead defeated Democratic candidate Leslie Petersen in the general election.

Freudenthal won all counties in 2006, this was reversed in this election when Mead won all counties.

Democratic primary

Candidates

Declared
Pete Gosar, teacher, commercial pilot, state employee and small business owner
Al Hamburg, retired painter and perennial candidate
Leslie Petersen, former Teton County Commissioner and Chair of the Wyoming Democratic Party
Rex Wilde, cabinet maker
Chris Zachary, former psychiatrist

Declined
Larry Clapp, attorney and former Mayor of Casper
Dave Freudenthal, incumbent Governor (Term Limited but there was  speculation  that he might challenge the law)
Paul Hickey, attorney
Mike Massie, State Senator (ran for Superintendent of Public Instruction)

Polling

Results

Republican primary

Candidates
Alan Kousoulos, 19-year WYDOT supervisor
Matt Mead, former U.S. Attorney
Rita Meyer, Wyoming State Auditor
Ron Micheli, former State Representative and former director of the Wyoming Department of Agriculture
John Self, candidate for governor in 2002 and 2006
Colin M. Simpson, Speaker of the Wyoming House of Representatives
Tom Ubben

Polling

Results

General election

Candidates
 Matt Mead (R)
 Leslie Peterson (D)
 Mike Wheeler (L)
 Taylor Haynes (Write-in)

Predictions

Polling

Results

References

External links
Elections at Wyoming Secretary of State
Candidates for Wyoming State Offices at Project Vote Smart
Campaign contributions for 2010 Wyoming Governor from Follow the Money
Wyoming Governor 2010 from OurCampaigns.com
2010 Wyoming Gubernatorial General Election: Matt Mead (R) vs. Leslie Petersen (D) graph of multiple polls from Pollster.com
Election 2010: Wisconsin Governor from Rasmussen Reports
2010 Wyoming Governor - Walker vs. Barrett from Real Clear Politics
2010 Wisconsin Governor's Race from CQ Politics
Race Profile in The New York Times
Candidates: Wyoming Governor at Decision 2010 at Wyoming PBS
Official campaign sites (Archived)
Matt Mead
Leslie Peterson

Wyoming
2010
Governor